Zaim may be a representation of the male Arabic given name Za'im / Zaeim, meaning leader, chief. Correspondingly al-Za'im means "the leader". Notable people with the name include:

Surname:
Alexander Zaim (born 1988), Swedish footballer
Cyril V Zaim (1655-1720), Patriarch of Antioch, nephew of Macarius
 Derviş Zaim (born 1964), Turkish Cypriot filmmaker and novelist
Husni al-Za'im (1897–1949), Syrian military officer and politician
Issam Al Zaim (1940-2007), Syrian economist and former minister of industry
Kourosh Zaim (born 1939), Iranian writer
Macarius III Ibn al-Za'im (died 1672), Patriarch of Antioch
Mohamed Ragab El-Zaim, Egyptian wrestler
Naureen Zaim (born 1978), American model, actor, artist, and boxer
Paul Za'im (1627-1669), Ottoman Syrian Orthodox clergyman and chronicler, son of Macarius
Given name:

 Mohamad Zaim Abu Hassan, Malaysian politician
 Mohd Lutfi Zaim Abdul Khalid (born 1989), Malaysian badminton player
 Zaim Imamović (1920-1994), Bosnian sevdalinka-folk singer, accordionist and author
 Zaim Imamović (1961-1995), Bosniak military officer
 Zaim Redžepović (born 1980), Serbian Bosniak politician
 Zaim Topčić (1920-1990), Yugoslav and Bosnian writer
 Hasnul Zaim bin Zafri (born 2002), Malaysian footballer

References

Arabic masculine given names
Turkish-language surnames